TEDOM C 18 is an prototype of a full low-floor single-decker articulated bus produced by now defunct bus manufacturing division of the company TEDOM from the Czech Republic in 2010.

Construction features 
This TEDOM C 18 is an prototype of a full low-floor single-decker articulated bus. Engine and automatic transmission are located in the left rear corner of the bus. Inside the bus are used plastic seats for the seating arrangement. Only rear C axle is propulsed and it is fully low-floor from the inside.

Production and operation 
Only one prototype was made in 2010. It is operated since 2012 in Ústí nad Labem and however the other orders were cancelled as TEDOM closed and folded.

See also

External links

 List of buses

Articulated buses
Low-floor buses
Tri-axle buses
Vehicles introduced in 2010
Buses of the Czech Republic
Buses manufactured by TEDOM